The pulmonary circulation is a division of the circulatory system in all vertebrates. The circuit begins with deoxygenated blood returned from the body to the right atrium of the heart where it is pumped out from the right ventricle to the lungs. In the lungs the blood is oxygenated and returned to the left atrium to complete the circuit.

The other division of the circulatory system is the systemic circulation that begins with receiving the oxygenated blood from the pulmonary circulation into the left atrium. From the atrium the oxygenated blood enters the left ventricle where it is pumped out to the rest of the body, returning as deoxygenated blood back to the pulmonary circulation.

The blood vessels of the pulmonary circulation are the pulmonary arteries and the pulmonary veins.

A separate circulatory circuit known as the bronchial circulation supplies oxygenated blood to the tissue of the larger airways of the lung.

Structure 

De-oxygenated blood leaves the heart, goes to the lungs, and then enters back into the heart. De-oxygenated blood leaves through the right ventricle through the pulmonary artery. From the right atrium, the blood is pumped through the tricuspid valve (or right atrioventricular valve) into the right ventricle. Blood is then pumped from the right ventricle through the pulmonary valve and into the pulmonary artery.

Lungs
The pulmonary arteries carry deoxygenated blood to the lungs, where carbon dioxide is released and oxygen is picked up during respiration. Arteries are further divided into very fine capillaries which are extremely thin-walled. The pulmonary veins return oxygenated blood to the left atrium of the heart.

Veins

Oxygenated blood leaves the lungs through pulmonary veins, which return it to the left part of the heart, completing the pulmonary cycle. This blood then enters the left atrium, which pumps it through the mitral valve into the left ventricle. From the left ventricle, the blood passes through the aortic valve to the aorta. The blood is then distributed to the body through the systemic circulation before returning again to the pulmonary circulation.

Arteries

From the right ventricle, blood is pumped through the semilunar pulmonary valve into the left and right main pulmonary artery (one for each lung), which branch into smaller pulmonary arteries that spread throughout the lungs.

Development
The pulmonary circulation loop is virtually bypassed in fetal circulation. The fetal lungs are collapsed, and blood passes from the right atrium directly into the left atrium through the foramen ovale (an open conduit between the paired atria) or through the ductus arteriosus (a shunt between the pulmonary artery and the aorta).

When the lungs expand at birth, the pulmonary pressure drops and blood is drawn from the right atrium into the right ventricle and through the pulmonary circuit. Over the course of several months, the foramen ovale closes, leaving a shallow depression known as the fossa ovalis.

Clinical significance
A number of medical conditions may affect the pulmonary circulation:
 Pulmonary hypertension describes an increase in resistance in the pulmonary arteries.
 Pulmonary embolism is occlusion or partial occlusion of the pulmonary artery or its branches by an embolus, usually from the embolization of a blood clot from deep vein thrombosis. It can cause difficulty breathing or chest pain, is usually diagnosed through a CT pulmonary angiography or V/Q scan, and is often treated with anticoagulants such as heparin and warfarin.
 Cardiac shunt is an unnatural connection between parts of the heart that leads to blood flow that bypasses the lungs.
 Vascular resistance
 Pulmonary shunt

History

The pulmonary circulation is archaically known as the "lesser circulation" which is still used in non-English literature.

The discovery of the pulmonary circulation has been attributed to many scientists with credit distributed in varying ratios by varying sources. In much of modern medical literature, the discovery is credited to English physician William Harvey (1578 – 1657 CE) based on the comprehensive completeness and correctness of his model, despite its relative recency. Other sources credit Greek philosopher Hippocrates (460 – 370 BCE), Spanish physician Michael Servetus (c. 1509 – 1553 CE), Arab physician Ibn al-Nafis (1213 – 1288 CE), and Syrian physician Qusta ibn Luqa. Several figures such as Hippocrates and al-Nafis receive credit for accurately predicting or developing specific elements of the modern model of pulmonary circulation: Hippocrates for being the first to describe pulmonary circulation as a discrete system separable from systemic circulation as a whole and al-Nafis for making great strides over the understanding of those before him and towards a rigorous model. There is a great deal of subjectivity involved in deciding at which point a complex system is "discovered", as it is typically elucidated in piecemeal form so that the very first description, most complete or accurate description, and the most significant forward leaps in understanding are all considered acts of discovery of varying significance.

Primitive descriptions of the cardiovascular system are found throughout several ancient cultures. The earliest known description of the role of air in circulation was produced in Egypt in 3500 BCE. At the time, the Egyptians believed that the heart was the origin of many channels that connected different parts of the body to each other and transported air – as well as urine, blood, and the soul – between them. The Edwin Smith Papyrus (1700 BCE), named for American Egyptologist Edwin Smith (1822 – 1906 CE) who purchased the scroll in 1862, provided evidence that Egyptians believed that the heartbeat created a pulse that transported the above substances throughout the body. A second scroll, the Ebers Papyrus (c. 1550 BCE), also emphasized the importance of the heart and its connection to vessels throughout the body and described methods to detect cardiac disease through pulse abnormalities. Although they had knowledge of the heartbeat, vessels, and pulse, the Egyptians attributed the movement of substances through the vessels to air that resided in these channels, rather than to the heart's exertion of pressure. The Egyptians knew that air played an important role in circulation but did not yet have a conception of the role of the lungs.

The next addition to the historical understanding of pulmonary circulation arrived with the Ancient Greeks. Physician Alcmaeon (520 – 450 BCE) proposed that the brain, not the heart, was the connection point for all of the vessels in the body. He believed that the function of these vessels was to bring the "spirit" ("pneuma") and air to the brain. Empedocles (492 – 432 BCE), a philosopher, proposed a series of pipes, impermeable to blood but continuous with blood vessels, that carried the pneuma throughout the body. He proposed that this spirit was internalized by pulmonary respiration.

Hippocrates was the first to describe pulmonary circulation as a discrete system, separable from systemic circulation, in his Corpus Hippocraticum, which is often regarded as the foundational text of modern medicine. Hippocrates developed the view that the liver and spleen produced blood, and that this traveled to the heart to be cooled by the lungs that surrounded it. He described the heart as having two ventricles connected by an interventricular septum, and depicted the heart as the nexus point of all of the vessels of the body. He proposed that some vessels carried only blood and that others carried only air. He hypothesized that these air-carrying vessels were divisible into the pulmonary veins, which carried in air to the left ventricle, and the pulmonary artery, which carried in air to the right ventricle and blood to the lungs. He also proposed the existence of two atria of the heart functioning to capture air. He was one of the first to begin to accurately describe the anatomy of the heart and to describe the involvement of the lungs in circulation. His descriptions built substantially on previous and contemporaneous efforts but, by modern standards, his conceptions of pulmonary circulation and of the functions of the parts of the heart were still largely inaccurate.

Greek philosopher and scientist Aristotle (384 – 322 BCE) followed Hippocrates and proposed that the heart had three ventricles, rather than two, that all connected to the lungs. Greek physician Erasistratus (315 – 240 BCE) agreed with Hippocrates and Aristotle that the heart was the origin of all of the vessels in the body but proposed a system in which air was drawn into the lungs and traveled to the left ventricle via pulmonary veins. It was transformed there into the pneuma and distributed throughout the body by arteries, which contained only air. In this system, veins distributed blood throughout the body, and thus blood did not circulate, but rather was consumed by the organs.

The Greek physician Galen (129 – c. 210 CE) provided the next insights into pulmonary circulation. Though many of his theories, like those of his predecessors, were marginally or completely incorrect, his theory of pulmonary circulation dominated the medical community's understanding for hundreds of years after his death. Galen contradicted Erasistratus before him by proposing that arteries carried both air and blood, rather than air alone (which was essentially correct, leaving aside that blood vessels carry constituents of air and not air itself). He proposed that the liver was the originating point of all blood vessels. He also theorized that the heart was not a pumping muscle but rather an organ through which blood passed. Galen's theory included a new description of pulmonary circulation: air was inhaled into the lungs where it became the pneuma. Pulmonary veins transmitted this pneuma to the left ventricle of the heart to cool the blood simultaneously arriving there. This mixture of pneuma, blood, and cooling produced the vital spirits that could then be transported throughout the body via arteries. Galen further proposed that the heat of the blood arriving in the heart produced noxious vapors that were expelled through the same pulmonary veins that first brought the pneuma. He wrote that the right ventricle played a different role to the left: it transported blood to the lungs where the impurities were vented out so that clean blood could be distributed throughout the body. Though Galen's description of the anatomy of the heart was more complete than those of his predecessors, it included several mistakes. Most notably, Galen believed that blood flowed between the two ventricles of the heart through small, invisible pores in the interventricular septum.

The next significant developments in the understanding of pulmonary circulation did not arrive until centuries later. Persian polymath Avicenna (c. 980 – 1037 CE) wrote a medical encyclopedia entitled The Canon of Medicine. In it, he translated and compiled contemporary medical knowledge and added some new information of his own. However, Avicenna's description of pulmonary circulation reflected the incorrect views of Galen.

The Arab physician, Ibn al-Nafis, wrote the Commentary on Anatomy in Avicenna's Canon in 1242 in which he provided possibly the first known description of the system that remains substantially congruent with modern understandings, in spite of its flaws. Ibn al-Nafis made two key improvements on Galen's ideas. First, he disproved the existence of the pores in the interventricular septum that Galen had believed allowed blood to flow between the left and right ventricles. Second, he surmised that the only way for blood to get from the right to the left ventricle in the absence of interventricular pores was a system like pulmonary circulation. He also described the anatomy of the lungs in clear and basically correct detail, which his predecessors had not. However, like Aristotle and Galen, al-Nafis still believed in the quasi-mythical concept of vital spirit and that it was formed in the left ventricle from a mixture of blood and air. Despite the enormity of Ibn al-Nafis's improvements on the theories that preceded him, his commentary on The Canon was not widely known to Western scholars until the manuscript was discovered in Berlin, Germany, in 1924. As a result, the ongoing debate among Western scholars as to how credit for the discovery should be apportioned failed to include Ibn al-Nafis until, at earliest, the mid-20th century (shortly after which he came to enjoy a share of this credit). In 2021, several researchers described a text predating the work of al-Nafis, fargh- beyn-roh va nafs, in which there is a comparable report on pulmonary circulation. The researchers argue that its author, Qusta ibn Luqa, is the best candidate for the discoverer of pulmonary circulation on a similar basis to arguments in favour of al-Nafis generally.

It took centuries for other scientists and physicians to reach conclusions that were similar to and then more accurate than those of al-Nafis and ibn Luqa. This later progress, constituting the gap between medieval and modern understanding, occurred throughout Europe. Italian polymath Leonardo da Vinci (1452 – 1519 CE) was one of the first to propose that the heart was just a muscle, rather than a vessel of spirits and air, but he still subscribed to Galen's ideas of circulation and defended the existence of interventricular pores. The Flemish physician Andreas Vesalius (1514 – 1564 CE) published corrections to Galen's view of circulatory anatomy, questioning the existence of interventricular pores, in his book De humani corporis fabrica libri septem in 1543. Spanish Michael Servetus, after him, was the first European physician to accurately describe pulmonary circulation. His assertions largely matched those of al-Nafis. In subsequent centuries, he has frequently been credited with the discovery, but some historians have propounded the idea that he potentially had access to Ibn al-Nafis's work while writing his own texts. Servetus published his findings in Christianismi Restituto (1553): a theological work that was considered heretical by Catholics and Calvinists alike. As a result, both book and author were burned at the stake and only a few copies of his work survived. Italian physician Realdo Colombo (c. 1515 – 1559 CE) published a book, De re anatomica libri XV, in 1559 that accurately described pulmonary circulation. It is still a matter of debate among historians as to whether Colombo reached his conclusions alone or based them to an unknown degree on the works of al-Nafis and Servetus. Finally, in 1628, the influential British physician William Harvey (1578 – 1657 AD) provided at the time the most complete and accurate description of pulmonary circulation of any scholar worldwide in his treatise Exercitatio Anatomica de Motu Cordis et Sanguinis in Animalibus. At the macroscopic level, his model is still recognizable in and reconcilable with modern understandings of pulmonary circulation.

References

External links 

 Official Journal of the Pulmonary Vascular Research Institute

Angiology
Respiratory physiology
Underwater diving physiology